Fanta cake is a cake made with a sponge base, the key ingredient of the sponge base is Fanta or sparkling mineral water, thus the cake base becomes fluffier than usual sponge based cakes. The Fanta as ingredient is also the name giving component. 
The top can be either a simple lemon glaze or a creamy layer made of heavy sour cream, whipped cream, sugar and canned mandarins.
The traditional measurement is in cups, which is uncommon as it originates from Germany, where it is called Fantakuchen
Fantakuchen is a popular cake for birthday parties or bake sales.

References

German cakes